Roger D. Holland was an American politician from Alaska. He was a member of the Alaska Senate District N, having been elected to that body in 2020. He defeated longtime incumbent Cathy Giessel in the primary election. In the 2022 Alaska Senate election, Holland was defeated by Giessel in a rematch.

References

Republican Party Alaska state senators
Living people
People from Anchorage, Alaska
Place of birth missing (living people)
Year of birth missing (living people)
21st-century American politicians